The 1980 FIBA Intercontinental Cup William Jones was the 14th edition of the FIBA Intercontinental Cup for men's basketball clubs. It took place October 1–5, 1980 at Skenderija, Sarajevo, Yugoslavia.

Participants

League stage
Day 1, October 1 1980

|}

Day 2, October 2 1980

|}

Day 3, October 3 1980

|}

Day 4, October 4 1980

|}

Day 5, October 5 1980

|}

Final standings

Sources
1980 Edition

External links
 1980 Intercontinental Cup William Jones

1980
1980–81 in European basketball
1980–81 in South American basketball
1980–81 in American college basketball
1980–81 in Yugoslav basketball
International basketball competitions hosted by Yugoslavia
International basketball competitions hosted by Bosnia and Herzegovina